David Eidelberg is an American neuroscientist who is a professor of Neurology and Molecular Medicine at the Donald and Barbara Zucker School of Medicine at Hofstra/Northwell. He is a neuroscientist best known for applying functional imaging of the brain to study neurological diseases.

Education and career
Eidelberg earned his BA at Columbia University in 1977, and his MD from Harvard Medical School (HMS) in 1981. After completing residency training in neurology at the Harvard-Longwood Area Training Program, he pursued postdoctoral training as a Moseley Traveling Fellow at the National Hospital, Queen Square, in London, and at Memorial Sloan-Kettering Cancer Center in New York.

In 1988, Eidelberg joined North Shore University Hospital in Manhasset, New York, where he established the Functional Brain Imaging Laboratory and the Movement Disorders Center. He is Susan & Leonard Feinstein Professor of Neurology and Neuroscience at The Feinstein Institute for Medical Research, and Professor of Neurology and Molecular Medicine at the Donald and Barbara Zucker School of Medicine at Hofstra/Northwell. He is the Director of the Feinstein Center for Neurosciences and an attending neurologist at North Shore University Hospital in Manhasset.

Research
Eidelberg has studied functional imaging methods to characterize large-scale network abnormalities in brain diseases like Parkinson's disease and dystonia.

Awards and boards
 Elected Member: Association of American Physicians, 2019 
 Bachman-Strauss Prize for Excellence in Dystonia, 2018 
 Scientific Advisory Board Member: Michael J. Fox Foundation, 2004–2018
 Associate Editor:  Journal of Neuroscience, 2011–2017
 Editor-in-Chief (Western Hemisphere): Current Opinion in Neurology, 2017 
 Scientific Advisory Board Member: Bachmann-Strauss Dystonia and Parkinson Foundation, 2009–2014
 Scientific Director of The Thomas Hartman Foundation for Parkinson's Research, 2007–2012
 American Academy of Neurology Movement Disorders Research Award, 2010
 American Parkinson Disease Association Fred Springer Award, 2005
 Editorial Board Member: Journal of Nuclear Medicine (1999–2018), Current Opinion in Neurology (2001–present), and Annals of Neurology (2006–2019)

References

Parkinson's disease researchers
Living people
American neuroscientists
Harvard Medical School alumni
Columbia University alumni
Year of birth missing (living people)